Kilgerran Halt railway station served the village of Cilgerran, Pembrokeshire, Wales, from 1886 to 1963 on the Whitland and Cardigan Railway.

History 
The station was formally opened on 31 August 1886, although services began a day later, by the Whitland and Cardigan Railway. It was situated on the east side of a minor road. It was going to be called Cilgerran but the GWR preferred the former spelling of the nearby village, Kilgerran. Opposite the platform was a loop with a nearby goods yard, comprising two sidings. It had a stone-built goods shed and a cattle dock. It was downgraded to an unstaffed halt in September 1956, thus the suffix 'Halt' was added to its name. It closed to passengers on 10 September 1962 and closed to goods on 27 May 1963. The goods yard remained open as a non rail connected coal depot until 3 April 1965.

References 

Disused railway stations in Pembrokeshire
Railway stations in Great Britain opened in 1886
Railway stations in Great Britain closed in 1962
1886 establishments in Wales
1963 disestablishments in Wales